The Sony α1 is a full-frame mirrorless interchangeable-lens camera by Sony that was announced on January 27, 2021. The α1 was announced together with the Xperia Pro smartphone, which can be used as an HDR monitor and a 5G transmitter. The camera became available in March 2021 starting at US$6500 and is aimed at professional photographers and videographers, covering wildlife, sports, action and landscape.

Features 

 New 50.1MP Exmor RS stacked BSI CMOS sensor
30.0 fps shooting with 165 JPEG image buffer (or 155 compressed RAW)
120 times per second AF and AE calculation
 Improved electronic shutter with 1.5× less rolling shutter
 5-axis in-body image stabilization
 8K30p and 4K120p video
 240 Hz OLED electronic viewfinder
 Expanded ISO 50–102,400
 Multi Interface Shoe with digital audio interface
 New heat dissipation structure for >30 minute 8K30p/4k60p recording
 Improved dust and moisture resistance

See also 
 List of Sony E-mount cameras
 Sony α9

References

External links 
 Full product specifications

α1
Full-frame mirrorless interchangeable lens cameras
Cameras introduced in 2021